John Kelly (April 20, 1822 – June 1, 1886) of New York City, known as "Honest John", was a boss of Tammany Hall and a U.S. Representative from New York from 1855 to 1858. The title "Honest" was given to him during his years as New York City Sheriff, and was more ironic than truthful.

Kelly was able to amass a vast fortune estimated at $800,000 ($ in current dollar terms) by 1867 by both ethical and questionable means. In addition, after having his methods questioned and his title insulted by New York City Mayor William Havemeyer, Kelly responded with a lawsuit for libel. On the day of the trial, Havemeyer mysteriously dropped dead of apoplexy. He had a questionable reputation and was the subject of a gubernatorial investigation at the time of his death.

Family life
Kelly was born in New York City to Hugh Kelly and Sarah Donnelly Kelly. He received a parochial education but was forced to quit when his father died. He married Ann McIlhargy, to whom a son and two daughters were born. By 1872, his wife and children had died. He then fled the city overseas, a defeated man from the loss of his family.

He returned to New York in response to the Boss Tweed scandal and eventually was remarried to Ann Theresa Mullen, the niece of New York's Cardinal McCloskey. A son and a daughter were born of that marriage.

Career
Kelly was apprenticed to the mason's trade, and engaged in business for himself at the age of 21. Kelly, in response to anti-Catholic sentiment, was driven to politics and became a champion of Catholic and immigrant causes in the 1840s. Kelly joined the influential Tammany Society and the next year he was elected alderman;  until his death, he was active as a Democratic politician. From 1855 to 1858, he served in Congress, the only Catholic in the House of Representatives in that period of Know Nothing ascendency. Kelly was later elected Sheriff of the County of New York and served from 1859 to 1861 and again from 1865 to 1867.

During Kelly's time as sheriff, his wife and children died and he left New York for an extended overseas trip. After nearly three years, he returned in 1871 and aided Charles O'Conor, Samuel J. Tilden, and their associates in the struggle against the Tweed ring, and Kelly cooperated with Tilden in reorganizing the political machine. The Tweed ring scandal destroyed the old Tammany leadership and shattered the democracy. It was a time of corruption and deceitful politics. Kelly was away and was seemingly untouched by the corruption and so was able to assume the leadership of Tammany Hall.

By 1874, Kelly was in control of Tammany Hall, and for the next decade, he was able to determine the course of New York City elections. In 1876, Kelly succeeded Andrew H. Green, appointed by Mayor William Wickham, as Comptroller of New York City. Kelly was very successful as comptroller. Over five years, the municipal debt was reduced by twelve million dollars. During his time in power he was continually at war with Tilden's faction. Kelly refused to support Tilden's candidate for governor, incumbent Lucius Robinson, and ran for governor himself as an independent. The result was the election in 1879 of Republican Alonzo Cornell, who won by a plurality. Kelly himself was city comptroller from 1876 to 1879. Upon retirement in 1884, he yielded his political control to one of his lieutenants, Richard Croker.

In popular culture
 Animated children's film An American Tail makes reference to Kelly with the character of "Honest John", voiced by Neil Ross.
 The song "Boys on the Docks", by the Celtic punk band Dropkick Murphys, was written in memory of Kelly and his popularity within the Irish-American and Catholic immigrant community.

References

Sources

Jerome Mushkat. "Kelly, John; American National Biography Online Feb. 2000.
Connable, Alfred, and Edward Silberfarb. Tigers of Tammany: Nine Men Who Ran New York. New York: Holt, Rinehart, and Winston, 1967. Print.

External links

 Tammany Hall Links 
 Authentic History Center description of Kelly's career

1822 births
1886 deaths
Leaders of Tammany Hall
American political bosses from New York (state)
American Roman Catholics
Democratic Party members of the United States House of Representatives from New York (state)
19th-century American politicians
New York City Comptrollers
19th-century American businesspeople